Leddie Brown (born February 28, 1999) is an American football running back for the Arlington Renegades of the XFL. He played college football at West Virginia.

Early years
Brown attended Smyrna High School in Smyrna, Delaware before transferring to Saints John Neumann and Maria Goretti Catholic High School in Philadelphia, Pennsylvania for his senior year. He had 899 rushing yards and 11 touchdowns his senior year. Brown committed to West Virginia University to play college football.

College career
Brown played in 11 games as a true freshman at West Virginia in 2018, rushing 91 times for 446 yards and four touchdowns. As a sophomore in 2019 he started three of 10 games and rushed for 367 yards on 107 carries and a touchdown. Brown took over as the teams starting running back his junior year in 2020. He finished the season with 1,010 yards on 199 carries with nine touchdowns. He returned to West Virginia for his senior year in 2021 rather than enter the 2021 NFL Draft. Brown started his senior season and played in all twelve games amassing 1065 yards and thirteen touchdowns on 223 carries and 217 yards receiving on thirty-six receptions.

Professional career

Los Angeles Chargers 
On April 30, 2022, Brown signed with the Los Angeles Chargers as an undrafted free agent. He was waived on August 30, 2022.

St. Louis BattleHawks
On November 17, 2022, Brown was drafted by the St. Louis BattleHawks of the XFL. On February 10, 2023, Brown was released by the BattleHawks.

Arlington Renegades
Brown signed with the Arlington Renegades of the XFL on March 17, 2023.

References

External links
West Virginia Mountaineers bio

1999 births
Living people
Players of American football from Philadelphia
American football running backs
West Virginia Mountaineers football players
Los Angeles Chargers players
St. Louis BattleHawks players
Arlington Renegades players